Octopuss is the third solo album by English drummer Cozy Powell, released in 1983.

Track listing

Side one
"Up on the Downs" (Mel Galley, Cozy Powell) – 3:55
"633 Squadron" (Ron Goodwin) – 4:13
"Octopuss" (Powell, Colin Hodgkinson) – 5:35
"The Big Country" (Jerome Moross, Morty Neff, Jack Lewis) – 2:56

Side two
"Formula One" (Galley, Powell) – 3:21
"Princetown" (Galley, Powell) – 4:37
"Dartmoore" (Gary Moore) – 5:41
"The Rattler" (David Coverdale, Powell) – 2:57

Personnel
 Cozy Powell – drums, percussion
 Colin Hodgkinson – bass guitar
 Mel Galley – guitar 
 Gary Moore – guitar on "Dartmoore"
 Jon Lord – keyboards
 Don Airey – keyboards
Technical
Bruce Payne & John Makepeace – production
Mike Johnson & Nick Griffiths – engineering, mixing

References

1983 albums
Polydor Records albums
Cozy Powell albums